US Post Office-Homer is a historic post office building located at Homer in Cortland County, New York.  It was built in 1937-1938 and is one of a number of post offices in New York State designed by the Office of the Supervising Architect of the Treasury Department, Louis A. Simon. It is a one-story, steel frame, five bay rectangular building clad in brick on a stucco clad foundation in the Colonial Revival style.  The interior features a mural by Frank Romanelli in 1940 titled "Albany Street Bridge over Tioughnioga River."  It is located within the boundaries of the Old Homer Village Historic District.

It was listed on the National Register of Historic Places in 1989.

References

Homer
Colonial Revival architecture in New York (state)
Government buildings completed in 1938
Buildings and structures in Cortland County, New York
National Register of Historic Places in Cortland County, New York
1938 establishments in New York (state)